Behzad Abdi (born 1973, Tehran, Iran) is an Iranian composer of opera, film, and television music.

Abdi studied setar and Iranian traditional music.

His opera "Rumi" from 2009, based on the life of Rumi, with libretto by Behrouz Gharibourm, and with Mohammad Motamadi, has been released on a UK label, Naxos.

Abdi is currently based in Kyiv, Ukraine.

Selected works
Rumi (opera)
Hafez (opera) 2013

References

1973 births
Living people